Ahli Sarba Sporting Club is a football club based in Jounieh, Lebanon, that competes in the . 

They previously played the Lebanese Premier League, but were relegated in the 1995–96 season by finishing in 14th place. They are the only football club in Keserwan that have been part of the Lebanese Premier League. The club is supported by the local Christian community. Helium FA, the partner of Ahli Sarba, plays in every youth division in the Lebanese championship as its replacement.

See also 
 Ahli Sarba
 Ahli Sarba BC
 List of football clubs in Lebanon

References

Ahli Sarba SC
Football clubs in Lebanon
1948 establishments in Lebanon
Association football clubs established in 1948